The 1950 Maryland gubernatorial election was held on November 7, 1950. Republican nominee Theodore McKeldin defeated Democratic incumbent William Preston Lane Jr. with 57.28% of the vote. 

, this was the last time the Democratic candidate lost re-election to a second term.

Primary elections
Primary elections were held on September 18, 1950.

Democratic primary

Candidates
William Preston Lane Jr., incumbent Governor of Maryland
George P. Mahoney, perennial candidate
Herbert William Larrabee 	
Harry Kemper 	
Stephen B. Peddicord

Results

General election

Candidates
Theodore McKeldin, Republican 
William Preston Lane Jr., Democratic

Results

References

1950
Maryland
Gubernatorial
November 1950 events in the United States